Main Street is a historic street in Yarmouth, Maine, United States. It is part of the   State Route 115 (SR 115), the eastern terminus of which is in Yarmouth at the intersection of Marina Road and Lafayette Street (SR 88), at Yarmouth Harbor in the Lower Falls area. Its western end is a merging with Walnut Hill Road in North Yarmouth, at which point SR 115 continues west.

As it crosses Elm Street, Main Street continues as West Main Street into North Yarmouth. It is East Main Street, meanwhile, from Lower Falls to Granite Street,  to the north.

The annual Yarmouth Clam Festival attracts around 120,000 people (around fourteen times its population) over the course of the three-day weekend and is centered on Main Street.

In 2022, the town began seeking feedback on a streetscape plan for the intersection of Main Street and Railroad Square, as part of the larger Main Street Sidewalk and Streetscape Master Plan and Design Recommendations program.

Architecture

Lower Falls
19th- and 20th-century homes and business that existed on Main Street in Yarmouth's Lower Falls (also Falls Village or The Falls) section are listed below, roughly from east to west.

East Main Street

East Main Street (which joins State Route 88 at the foot of the hill) crosses the East Main Street Bridge at the First Falls and has been a route to the northeastern part of Yarmouth (and into Freeport) since the founding of the town.

Henry Bailey Hitchcock lived at 30 East Main Street, built in 1870.

35 East Main Street was built in 1848. Its brick basement was once used as a store by Nathan Oakes and Daniel Mitchell. Shipbuilder Jeremiah Baker lived here between 1857 and around 1871.

38 East Main Street was built by shipbuilder Albion Seabury in 1844. Directly opposite, number 43 was originally owned by Johnathan True in 1780, a clothier who owned a store at Lower Falls. It was later associated with Dr. David Jones and David Pratt, one of Yarmouth's earliest shipbuilders.

Number 49, built in 1779, was moved here in 1817 by Major Daniel Mitchell and later expanded by Daniel L. Mitchell. As of 2018, the nine-over-six windows, entry door and surround, trim and siding are all original.

51 East Main Street was built in 1810 and was once the home of William Stockbridge, a prominent merchant, ship owner and town treasurer. After Stockbridge's death in 1850, many of the facilities he owned in the area were sold. These included his home, his wharf, shipyard and a large parcel of riverside land. His former home was operated as the main building of the Royal River Cabins until the 1940s.

Number 56 was built, likely by clockmaker Lebbeus Bailey (1763–1827), in 1792. It was also associated with Albion Seabury. Next door, at 64 East Main, is a home built by Augustus True in 1865.

Known locally as Stockbridge Hall, number 68, at the corner of East Main and Yankee Drive, was built around 1725.

Close to the East Main and Spring Street split, number 96 was likely built by Samuel Buxton and later occupied by Nathaniel True.

100 East Main Street was built in 1810. Around twenty years later it became Asa Bisbee's blacksmith shop. Next door, number 112, was built by Jacob Jones around 1818.

Just beyond the junction with Willow Street stands number 129, which was built by Madison Northey around 1865.

Samuel Kinney lived at number 148 around 1813. It was built in 1810.

Main Street

Nicholas Grant built the main building of the since-expanded Greek Revival house at 37 Main Street, on the hill down to the harbor, around 1844.

Henry Rowe (1812–1870) was the architect of the pink Gothic Revival house at 49 Main Street, the Alfred Seabury House, which was built in 1845. Rowe also designed The Gothic House in Portland.

50 Main Street, the three-storey old Hose No. 2 at the Main Street and Marina Road split (formerly known as Staples Hill), was built for the fire department around 1889.

Back on the northern side of the street, number 57 was built around 1813.

Next door, number 63, was built for Bethiah Staples around 36 years later, in 1849.

76 Main Street, set back from the road, adjacent to Torrey Court, was built in 1792. The home has six bedrooms, five bathrooms, and sits on 1.6 acres.

73 Main Street, the left elevation of which faces the street, was once the home of Jacob G. Loring.

In the building at 82–84 Main Street was W. N. Richards & Co. (owned by William Richards), established in 1864; in the 1960s, Vining's delicatessen and, beside it to the west, George Soule's ice cream shop and pool hall. Soule died in 1923, from paralysis, aged 79.

Across the street, the brick building at 85 Main Street currently occupied by Svetlana was erected around 1848.

90 Main Street, built in 1875, was Barbour's hardware store; later Goffs hardware (1969–2015).

Manley E. Bishop's grocery store stood to the east of the present-day Goffs building.

Englishman James Parsons' (1811–1876) grocery store, "a two-story building standing on the lot adjoining that where stood for so many years the little old post office". It was here that "dignified citizens like Doctor James Bates, L.L. Shaw and Barnabas Freeman often assembled for an evening's chat". Parsons came to Yarmouth around 1860 and wed a wealthy local girl. Upon Parsons' death in 1876, his son, Alvarado H. (1848–1915), took over the business.

The post office until around 1905. The first postmaster was Payne Elwell (1744–1820) in 1793. (He lived in the building that is now 162 Main Street, which stands on the former site of the Knights of Pythias Hall, Westcustogo Lodge, No. 33) He was succeeded in 1803 by Samuel P. Russell, David Drinkwater in 1804, John Hale in 1810, Daniel Mitchell in 1816, James C. Hill in 1834, Jacob G. Loring in 1842 and Reuben Cutter in 1845. When the town split occurred, the office name was changed in 1852 to Yarmouth from North Yarmouth. Reuben Cutter resumed the role, and was followed by Otis Briggs Pratt in 1861 and Nicholas Drinkwater in 1866. Lucy V. Groves was appointed in 1868, becoming the first woman named or elected to an official position in the town of Yarmouth. Lucy Q. Cutter succeeded her in 1887, Melville C. Merrill in 1898, Frank Howard Drinkwater in 1911, Frank O. Wellcome in 1914 and Ernest C. Libby in 1936.

Cornelius Shaw's Cash Market (1899). The plural version, Shaws', appeared on the sign, indicating it was a family business.

At today's 91 Main Street is the former Captain Thomas Chase Store, built around 1819. Between 1895 and 1929 it was Leon Doughty's stove and hardware store, L.A. Doughty & Co. It is now Snip 'N Clip Hair Designs, still with the windows that were installed in 1932. Doughty moved across the street, into the building to be later occupied by L. R. Doherty's hardware store, Barbour's and Goffs, when his business expanded.

William H. Freeman's hairdressing salon (located above Doughty's before its move). Freeman lived on Lafayette Street. He had at least two children: William and Jennie.

Cyrus Curtis' Saturday Evening Post publishers.

The millinery shop of Susan Kinghorn (located at the eastern corner of Main and Portland Streets in the building now occupied by Rosemont Market); between 1942 and 1953 [Harold B.] Allen's Variety Store, then Daken's, Romie's, Lindahl's, Donatelli's Pizza, Denucci's Pizza (briefly) and Connor's.

Elder Rufus York's general store, located in the brick building now occupied by Runge's Oriental Rug store at 108 Main Street, on the western corner of the Portland Street intersection. York ran the store with his wife, Zoa.

In 1874, the Lower Falls near the harbor was crowded with the homes of sea captains, merchants and shipbuilders.

An ornate, circular horse trough resembling a water fountain existed at the intersection of Main and Portland Streets in the early 1900s; it now stands behind the Merrill Memorial Library.

The parsonage for the Universalist church was the brick building at 89 Main Street, now occupied by Plumb-It, et al., to the east of Snip 'N Clip. It was built around 1845 by Bradbury True, whose sons owned the neighboring houses.

95 Main Street, a high-style Italianate, is now owned by the First Universalist Church.

On the other side of the church, at number 109, just to the east of where Old Sloop (later known as Union Hall) once stood, is an 1850-built Italianate house that was formerly the home of Edward J. Stubbs, one of Yarmouth's most prolific and successful shipbuilders.

Lyman Walker (1814–1906) and his son, Lyman Fessenden Walker, owned a general wood and coal business in the lower village.

124 Main Street, which faces the Bridge Street intersection, is the circa-1825 John Sargent House. Next door, at number 128, is a 1925-built house now used as the NYA admissions office.

Brickyard Hollow

The section of town between the Upper Village and Lower Falls was known as Brickyard Hollow, named for the brick-making business that was located across the street from the Masonic Hall (now the restaurant Gather) at 189 Main Street, which was built in the 1870s.

A muddy valley up until the beginning of the 20th century, the Hollow was eventually reclaimed as a civic center by laying down a two-foot layer of black ash, from Forest Paper Company, to level it out. After constructing two new schools, the Merrill Memorial Library and a war memorial, town officials also decided to rename the area Centervale in order to improve its image. The name did not last, however.

Sylvanus Blanchard lived in the brick building at 158 Main Street around 1847, before moving to number 317. As of 2018, the original barn is still attached.

The cape at 163 Main Street was built around 1843. 171 Main Street, on the eastern corner of the York Street intersection, dates from about the same year. Across the intersection, at 179 Main Street, is a Greek Revival cape built in 1842.

A lithograph from 1851, depicting the area of Main Street serviced by York Street, shows the home of George Woods and, next door, the Yarmouth Institute, which he established as direct competition with North Yarmouth Academy. Although it attracted students from as far afield as Cuba, his institute lacked an endowment and closed after five years. Woods sold the building to Paul Blanchard in 1853. It was torn down in 1930. In 1859, while serving in his new role as chancellor of the University of Pittsburgh, a lawsuit involving his dispute with NYA precipitated the split in Yarmouth's First Parish Church.

In 1890, Yarmouth built a large new school building on the site of the present, 1975-built town hall. Grades 5 to 8 were on the first floor; the high school occupied the upper level. A three-storey high school was constructed next to this in 1900. When all of the high-school students were sent to North Yarmouth Academy in 1930, the building became another elementary school. In 1974, both buildings were demolished to make way for the current construction.

In 1903, six years before his death at the age of 76, Joseph Edward Merrill donated the funds to build a new library, while George W. Hammond donated the land from his Forest Paper Company. The architect was Alexander Longfellow, a nephew of the poet Henry Wadsworth Longfellow. Also involved in the library's construction was John Coombs, father of George and Albert. Despite the occasional flood, town offices were eventually established in the library's basement. The flooding was partly caused by the blockage of Cleaves Brook (to the left of the town hall) — which formerly drained the whole center of town — when Brickyard Hollow was filled in.

Directly across the street from the library stood the Dumphy house and barn. These were auctioned off in 1921, creating more public space in Centervale.

In 1904, the town's Civil War veterans sought permission to place a soldiers monument in front of the new schools. With funds lacking, it was put off until after World War I (during which 106 Yarmouth residents served), when the project was completed in tandem with a board of trade plan to erect a bandstand. The resulting octagonal structure, in the Doric order, was adorned by a plaque to the veterans. The words "Memorial To Men of Yarmouth in War Service" appeared just below the roof line. The structure was inadequately maintained, however, and had to be removed when rotting floorboards resulted in injuries.

In 1929, a new centralized post office was built to the east of the present 1932-dedicated Anderson-Mayberry American Legion Hall (named for servicemen Edgar Anderson and Edwin Mayberry, who died from the Spanish flu while based at Fort Devens). On the left side of this building was the Fidelity Trust Company. The bank failed early in the Great Depression of the 1930s. To the east of the post office stood the Knights of Pythias Hall. It became the Pastime Theatre in the 1920s, then Yarmouth Theatre between 1942 and 1956. Harriman's IGA Foodliner moved here in the late 20th century from its Main and West Elm Streets location. A KeyBank (formerly Casco Bank) and the parking lot for NYA's Priscilla Savage Middle School now stand in its place.

During the middle of the 20th century, in the plaza across Cleaves Street that formerly housed a 7-Eleven and, until 2017, Anthony's Dry Cleaners & Laundromat, was the Dairy Joy ice-creamery, in front, and the Korner Kitchen (formerly the Snack Shack) behind it.

Across the street, at the intersection of Main and School Streets (in the building filled by People's United Bank), the post office occupied its final location before its move to Forest Falls Drive.

Ship owner Cyrus Foss Sargent's home stands at 251 Main Street. It ran as the Village Inn between 1916 and 1920.

In 1867, the building at 261 Main Street (across from Hancock Lumber) was built for Sylvanus Cushing Blanchard. Later owners of the house include Joseph York Hodsdon, proprietor of Hodsdon Shoe Company, and Dr. Fiore Agesilao Parisi.

273 Main Street, which stands at the entrance to Camp Hammond, is a "highly-altered former church" built in 1880. In November 1900, the saw mill of W. H. Walker and A. H. Cleaves was established across from where the Grand Trunk depot stands today.

On January 2, 2009, twenty-six businesses located at 500 Route 1 were destroyed in an arson attack. The entire block, located near to the point at which Route 1 passes over Main Street, was pulled down shortly thereafter. Damage was estimated to be between $2 million and $4 million. Everett Stickney, of Exeter, New Hampshire, was convicted of starting the fire, along with another one in York, Maine, later that evening. On November 12, 2009, Stickney was sentenced to an eleven-and-a-half-year prison term and ordered to pay $3.7 million in compensation.  The building was replaced in 2008 and several businesses have moved in.

U.S. Route 1 arrived in town in the late 1940s, shortly after the conclusion of World War II.

Upper Village
Businesses and residences in the Upper Village and the area around the intersection of Main and Elm Street, which officially became known as Yarmouthville in 1882, are listed below, roughly from west to east.

A house that stood at the corner of Main and East Elm was moved to 45 Baker Street around 1890.

In the mid-to-late 1870s, diagonally across from where Handy Andy's now is, was Jeremiah Mitchell's "Temperance House" tavern. Mitchell died in 1869, aged about 31. The inn's location later became the site of Wilfred W. Dunn's house, then, between 1959 and 1972, Norton's Texaco gas station. It is now Latchstring Park.

After his death in 1811, the family of Dr. William Parsons moved into a colonial home, built around 1790 by its first occupant, Ebenezer Corliss, where the single-storey building now stands at the corner of Main and West Elm Streets. The house was torn down in 1950. The existing building, at 366, constructed in 1945 but since widened, formerly housed a pool hall, Edgar Read Smith's grocery store, Harriman's IGA Foodliner, and Turner's Television sales and service business.

Sam York's grocery store, located to the east of the Parsons residence, was built in 1890. Like the Parsons' residence, it is now gone.

Adelaide Abbott's millinery shop, located to the east of York's.

The building that housed George H. Jefferd's harness shop (today's 358 Main Street) was built in 1890. Isaac Johnson's barbershop was located above Jefferd's.

The post office, opened in May 1882. Its first postmistress was W. L. Haskell, followed by Joseph Raynes in 1886. He remained in the position for 28 years, leaving the post in 1914 to Beecher True Lane. Anna Tibbetts Douglass followed in 1919. This branch was closed in 1928, and a village carrier system began at the central office.

At the corner of Main and East Elm Streets stood a nail mill in 1807. (East Elm Street was known for a period as Mill Street, before today's incarnation was given its name.) In 1891, what was then Nathaniel Foster's pottery was torn down, after about fifty years in existence, and a new building was constructed. Since then, more than thirty different business or owners have set up here, including, between 1906 and 1935, Arthur and Harry Storer's hardware store, Storer Bros. It was later John Ambrose Griffin's hardware store, and became Andy's Handy Store – named for proprietor, Leland "Andy" Anderson. In 1935, a 31-year-old Anderson combined the two wooden buildings of Griffin's and an adjacent grocery store (which sold produce "at Portland prices"). Colloquially named Handy Andy's, it became occupied by OTTO Pizza in 2014. Thoroughfare have occupied the entire building since early 2022.

William Marston's dry goods store (founded in 1859; closed circa 1968). It occupied the Brick Store for around a century.

Located next door to Marston's was Leone R. Cook's apothecary, where Frank Bucknam was an apprentice. Cook arrived in Yarmouth around 1880.

Harold Roy "Snap" Moxcey's barbershop, which he ran with his father Clarence ("Pop"), was located at the corner of Main and Center Streets, across Center Street from the Baptist church. The building was moved around 1990 and now stands on the property of 463 Lafayette Street, across from the Ledge Cemetery. Ernest C. Libby was an employee with the Moxceys for thirteen years before opening his own barber shop on Center Street.

To the right of the barbershop was Claude Kingsley's candy-distribution business.

A barber shop, beside the Baptist church, was owned by Charlie Reinsborough.

The Italianate number 347 is significant for its association with Captain Richard Harding, a sea captain, town clerk and state representative.

343 Main Street was the home of Smith's General Store for "much of the 1900s". It also had a couple of American Oil Company gas pumps just off the sidewalk.

339 Main Street was the home of local miller Amassa Baker, built in 1800.

Coombs Bros. (Albert and George) candy and grocery store (located at 298 Main Street in the building between Railroad Crossing and South Street in a different construction than what is standing today). Bert set up the town's telephone service in 1895. Elmer Ring's "washerette" later stood in the Coombs location, and it was he who changed the roofline and façade of the building. He also ran a hardware store, a heating and plumbing service, and a coal yard. In 2020, the town gave permission for developers to tear down the historic building.

Captain Eben York's mansion at 326 Main Street (occupied since 1910 by the Parish Office of the Sacred Heart Catholic Church next door). Father Joseph Quinn held services in the barn until it burned in 1913.

Where Peachy's Smoothie Cafe stands today at 301 Main Street was, from 1905 until 1913, Bernstein's Department Store. Robert Bernstein, born in Germany, saw his business burn down in July 1913. He reopened the store in a new location across the street.

St. Lawrence House – a hotel built, where the Mobil gas station near Camp Hammond stands today, to take advantage of the Atlantic and St. Lawrence Railroads coming through town. Circa 1872, it was renamed the Baker House, after its owner Jeremiah Baker (he previously lived at what is now 35 East Main Street, overlooking his shipyard, between 1857 and around 1871). It was the first of several name changes, including Royal River Hotel (when owned by O.E. Lowell in the late 19th century), U.S. House, Westcustogo House and Yarmouth Hotel. The expected tourists never materialized, and the hotel burned down in 1926. Grange Hall stood behind the hotel. Lowell Hall was in the second storey of the stable.

James O. Durgan's daguerreotype salon (located just to the east of the hotel; later Gad Hitchcock's coffin and casket showroom).

Alson Brawn's jewelry shop (at what was then 73 Main Street; formerly Sidney Bennett's Yarmouth Market, now Hancock Lumber).

309 Main Street, at the eastern corner of Mill Street, is an 1850s–1880s house.

An elm tree in front of Marston's store had a bulletin board nailed to it, upon which local residents posted, as early as 1817, public notices, circus posters and satirical comments about town affairs. Like almost all of Yarmouth's elms, it became afflicted by Dutch elm disease and was cut down in 1980.

West Main Street
West Main Street (still Route 115) leads into North Yarmouth.

The original owner of number 5, the first house on the northern side of West Main, was Captain Samuel Drinkwater in 1803. It later passed to his brother, Captain Joseph Drinkwater.

A hospital, run by Mrs Gilbert, was on the site now occupied by Coastal Manor nursing home at 20 West Main Street. One of the two buildings dates to around 1860; the other around 1835.

A 1973 survey dates number 17, a duplex, to 1807; however, a town assessor says 1860.

27 West Main Street, the Louis P. Pomeroy House, is circa 1890. In 2009, the owner found a shingle signed by Mr. Pomeroy confirming he was the home's builder (additional marking discovered in 2020 on the house front with date May 25, 1889), John Calvin Stevens and Albert Winslow Cobb are confirmed architects via house plans on file at Yarmouth Historical Society. Mr. Pomeroy grew up across the street and eventually built the house. He is also credited with several other projects including the original Town Hall and schools and Main Street Baptist church.

The cape at number 43 was built for yeoman Matthias Storer around 1802.

The Alexander Mills House, at number 54, is circa 1796.

Cyrus Kingsley lived at number 57 around 1865.

A 1973 survey suggests number 60 was built in 1790.

65 West Main Street originates from around 1800.

Deacon Jacob Mitchell lived at number 89. It was later owned by Henry Barbour, who operated a dairy farm.

There are two brick schools at 117 and 121 West Main, just beyond the Sligo Road intersection. The first, the District Number 4 school, was built around 1841 and repaired in the 1890s. In 1847, teacher William Osgood had 74 students; as such, a second school was built beside the original soon after. The second building was likely built around 1856. Both schools closed in 1992, when Harrison Middle School opened.

A large wooden building located at the intersection of West Main Street and Sligo Road, next to the old brick schools, served as the town hall between 1833 and 1910. It was here that the 1849 debates took place that led to Yarmouth's secession from North Yarmouth.

124 West Main Street, which is turned sideways to the road, dates to 1810.

William M. R. Lunt was the original owner of number 139, circa 1856.

Number 154, at the eastern corner of Bates Street, dates to around 1880.

John Cutter, yeoman and grandson of Ammi, was the original occupant of number 163, circa 1795. The house sits at the top of a small hill.

190 West Main, a cape, dates to the early 19th century.

A 1973 survey indicates number 195 was constructed in the 1870s.

233 West Main Street is an imposing three-storey, fifteen-room Italianate mansion that was built for ship captain Reuben Merrill (1818–1875) in 1858. The home is one of three known surviving works of Portland architect Thomas J. Sparrow. It was built by John Dunham, a local master builder. In 2011, the Merrill family leased the home to Maine Preservation, a historic preservation organization.

At the eastern corner of the intersection with Fieldstone Drive, number 284, stands a circa-1792 cape. Formerly the home of Nathan Safford.

References

Streets in Yarmouth, Maine